Municipal elections were held in Alberta, Canada on Monday, October 16, 2017. Mayors (reeves), councillors (aldermen), and trustees were up for election in all cities (except Lloydminster), all towns, all villages, all specialized municipalities, all municipal districts, three of the eight improvement districts, and the advisory councils of the special areas.

Cities

Airdrie

Mayor

Council
Top six candidates elected and are shown in bold

Brooks

Calgary

Mayor

Camrose

Chestermere

Cold Lake

Edmonton

Mayor

Fort Saskatchewan

Grande Prairie

Mayor

Council
Top eight candidates elected and are marked in bold

Lacombe

Leduc

Lethbridge

Mayor

Council
Top eight candidates elected and are marked in bold

Medicine Hat

Mayor

Council
Top eight candidates elected and are shown in bold

Red Deer

Mayor

Council
Top eight candidates elected and are marked in bold

Each voter cast up to eight votes each

121,746 valid votes cast

128 ballots rejected due to too many choices marked.

Percentage indicated is of votes cast, not of percentage of voters' support.

Spruce Grove

St. Albert

Mayor

Council
Top six candidates elected and are in bold

Wetaskiwin

Towns
The following are the 2017 municipal election results for towns with 5,000 or more inhabitants.

Banff

Beaumont

Blackfalds

Mayor

Council

Bonnyville

Canmore

Coaldale

Cochrane

Devon

Didsbury

Drayton Valley

Drumheller

Edson

High River

Hinton

Innisfail

Morinville

Okotoks

Olds

Peace River

Ponoka

Redcliff

Rocky Mountain House

Slave Lake

Stettler

Stony Plain

St. Paul

Strathmore

Sylvan Lake

Taber

Vegreville

Wainwright

Westlock

Whitecourt

Specialized municipalities

Municipality of Crowsnest Pass

Lac La Biche County

Mackenzie County
Mackenzie County elects its reeve from among its ten council members.

Strathcona County

Mayor

Council

Regional Municipality of Wood Buffalo

Mayor

Council
Elected candidates shown in bold

Municipal districts

Athabasca County
Athabasca County elects its reeve from among its nine council members.

County of Barrhead No. 11
The County of Barrhead No. 11 elects its reeve from among its seven council members.

Beaver County
Beaver County elects its reeve from among its five council members.

Big Lakes County
Big Lakes County elects its reeve from among its nine council members.

Municipal District of Bonnyville No. 87

Brazeau County

Camrose County
Camrose County elects its reeve from among its seven council members.

Clearwater County
Clearwater County elects its reeve from among its seven council members.

Cypress County
Cypress County elects its reeve from among its nine council members.

Municipal District of Foothills No. 31
The Municipal District of Foothills No. 31 elects its mayor from among its seven council members.

County of Grande Prairie No. 1
The County of Grande Prairie No. 11 elects its mayor from among its nine council members.

Municipal District of Greenview No. 16
The Municipal District of Greenview No. 16 elects its reeve from among its eight council members.

Kneehill County
Kneehill County elects its reeve from among its seven council members.

Lacombe County
Lacombe County elects its reeve from among its seven council members.

Lac Ste. Anne County
Lac Ste. Anne County elects its mayor from among its seven council members.

Leduc County
Leduc County elects its mayor from among its seven council members.

Lethbridge County
Lethbridge County elects its reeve from among its seven council members.

Mountain View County
Mounatain View County elects its reeve from among its seven council members.

County of Newell
The County of Newell elects its reeve from among its ten council members.

Parkland County

Ponoka County
Ponoka County elects its reeve from among its five council members.

Red Deer County

Rocky View County
Council

Rocky View County's council elects the reeve from among the nine of themselves after the election.

County of Stettler No. 6
The County of Stettler No. 6 elects its reeve from among its seven council members.

County of St. Paul No. 19

Sturgeon County

Municipal District of Taber
The Municipal District of Taber elects its reeve from among its seven council members.

County of Vermilion River
The County of Vermilion River elects its reeve from among its seven council members.

Vulcan County
Vulcan County elects its reeve from among its seven council members.

Westlock County
Westlock County elects its reeve from among its seven council members.

County of Wetaskiwin No. 10
The County of Wetaskiwin No. 10 elects its reeve from among its seven council members.

Wheatland County
Wheatland County elects its reeve from among its seven council members.

Municipal District of Willow Creek No. 26
The Municipal District of Willow Creek No. 26 elects its reeve from among its seven council members.

Yellowhead County

See also 
2017 Alberta municipal censuses
List of municipalities in Alberta

References 

 
Elections in Alberta